Marlon de Souza Lopes (born September 5, 1976) is a Brazilian football player.

Club statistics

References

External links

Kawasaki Frontale

1976 births
Living people
Brazilian footballers
Brazilian expatriate footballers
Expatriate footballers in Japan
Expatriate footballers in Turkey
J2 League players
União São João Esporte Clube players
Figueirense FC players
Kawasaki Frontale players
Association football forwards
Footballers from Curitiba